Kempei Usui (碓井 健平, born May 15, 1987) is a former Japanese footballer who last played as a goalkeeper for Okinawa SV.

Career
His father Hiroyuki was also a footballer, playing for the Japanese national team and the corporative version of Kashiwa Reysol between the 1970s and 1980s. 

After playing for Okinawa SV as the last of his career, he retired in December 2019.

Club statistics
Updated to 23 February 2020.

References

External links

Profile at Shimizu S-Pulse

1987 births
Living people
University of Tsukuba alumni
Association football people from Chiba Prefecture
Japanese footballers
J1 League players
J2 League players
Shimizu S-Pulse players
JEF United Chiba players
FC Machida Zelvia players
Okinawa SV players
Association football goalkeepers